Diane Martel (also known as Bucky Chrome) is an American music video director and choreographer.

Awards  
Diane Martel was nominated for the Video of the Year for her work in "Blurred Lines" – Robin Thicke feat. Pharrell & T.I. in 2013.

Filmography

Choreographer

1989
Bloodhounds of Broadway (1989) (feature film directed by Howard Brookner)

1991
"Shiny Happy People" – R.E.M. (music video directed by Katherine Dieckmann)

1993
Life with Mikey (1993) (feature film directed by James Lapine)

Documentary director

1990
"House of Tres" (1990) (short documentary on Voguing in the New York ballroom scene)

1992
"Reckin' Shop: Live From Brooklyn" (1992) (PBS featured 1/2-hour B/W documentary (hip-hop dancers in Brooklyn)

Music video director

1992
"Throw Ya Gunz" – Onyx

1993
"Crewz Pop" – Da Youngsta's
"Dreamlover" – Mariah Carey
"Chief Rocka" – Lords of the Underground

1994
"All I Want for Christmas Is You" – Mariah Carey
"Miss You Most (At Christmas Time)" – Mariah Carey
"Bring the Pain" – Method Man
"What I'm After" – Lords of the Underground
"Mass Appeal" – Gang Starr
"Mad Props" – Da Youngsta's
"Can't Wait" – Redman
"The Most Beautifullest Thing in This World" – Keith Murray

1995
"Live Niguz" – Onyx
"Brooklyn Zoo" – Ol' Dirty Bastard
"I'll Be There for You/You're All I Need to Get By" – Method Man featuring Mary J. Blige
"How High" – Method Man & Redman
"The Riddler" – Method Man

1996
"Funkorama" – Redman
"It's Alright" – Dave Hollister
"World So Cruel" – Flesh-n-Bone featuring Ms. Chaz Monique & Reverend Run

1997
"Head over Heels" – Allure featuring Nas
"Closer"/"Driver's Seat" – Capone-N-Noreaga featuring Smoke of Complexions
"Just Wanna Please U (Remix)" – Mona Lisa featuring The Lox
"4, 3, 2, 1" – LL Cool J featuring Method Man, Redman, Canibus, and DMX

1998
"The Worst" – Onyx featuring Wu-Tang Clan
"The Roof" – Mariah Carey
"Breakdown" – Mariah Carey featuring Bone Thugs-n-Harmony
"My All" (So So Def Remix) – Mariah Carey
"Whenever You Call" – Mariah Carey featuring Brian McKnight
"Money, Power & Respect" – The Lox featuring DMX and Lil' Kim
"Angel of Mine" – Monica
"N.O.R.E." – N.O.R.E.
"Eyes Better Not Wander" – Nicole Wray

1999
"Heartbreaker" (Remix) – Mariah Carey
"Genie in a Bottle" – Christina Aguilera
"Another Love Song" – Insane Clown Posse
"What a Girl Wants" – Christina Aguilera
"Incredible" – Keith Murray featuring LL Cool J
 "Paper" – Krayzie Bone

2000
"Case of the Ex" – Mýa
"Send It On" – D'Angelo
"If You Don't Wanna Love Me" – Tamar
"Keep It Thoro" – Prodigy
"Focus" – Erick Sermon featuring DJ Quik & Xzibit
"Front 2 Back" – Xzibit

2001
"Young, Fresh n' New" – Kelis
"Who's That Girl?" – Eve
"Lapdance" – N.E.R.D
"After the Rain Has Fallen" – Sting

2002
"Like I Love You" – Justin Timberlake
"Just a Friend 2002" – Mario
"From tha Chuuuch to da Palace" – Snoop Dogg
"My Neck, My Back (Lick It)" – Khia

2003
"Stuck" – Stacie Orrico
"Dance with My Father" – Luther Vandross
"My Goddess" – The Exies

2004
"If I Ain't Got You" – Alicia Keys
"Welcome to My Truth" – Anastacia
"I Could Be the One" – Stacie Orrico
"Bridging the Gap" – Nas
"Nobody's Home" – Avril Lavigne
"What's Happenin'" – Method Man featuring Busta Rhymes
"Truth Is" – Fantasia
"Shake Your Coconuts" – Junior Senior

2005
"Hold You Down" – Jennifer Lopez featuring Fat Joe
"Get Right" (Remix) – Jennifer Lopez featuring Fabolous
"I Don't Care" – Ricky Martin featuring Fat Joe and Amerie
"Do You Want To" – Franz Ferdinand
"Don't Let It Go to Your Head" – Fefe Dobson
"L.O.V.E." – Ashlee Simpson
"So High" – John Legend
"Fearless" – The Bravery
"Gotta Go Gotta Leave (Tired)" – Vivian Green
"Touch" – Omarion
"U Already Know" – 112

2006
"Doing Too Much" – Paula DeAnda featuring Baby Bash
"Ride a White Horse" – Goldfrapp
"In My Mind" – Heather Headley
"I'm Not Missing You" – Stacie Orrico
"Listen" – Beyoncé
"Tu Amor" – RBD
"Promise" – Ciara

2007
"Read My Mind" – The Killers
"For Reasons Unknown" – The Killers
"Men's Needs" – The Cribs
"An End Has a Start" – Editors
"Conquest" – The White Stripes
"Like You'll Never See Me Again" – Alicia Keys
"Like a Boy" – Ciara

2008
"The Boss" – Rick Ross
"Who's That Girl" – Robyn
"Google Me" – Teyana Taylor
"Everyone Nose (All the Girls Standing in the Line for the Bathroom)" – N.E.R.D
"Addiction" – Ryan Leslie featuring Cassie and Fabolous
"Eat You Up" (American version) – BoA (the music video was later scrapped)
"Whatcha Think About That" – The Pussycat Dolls
"Best of Me" – Daniel Powter

2009
"Mad" – Ne-Yo
"If This Isn't Love" – Jennifer Hudson
"Love Sex Magic" – Ciara featuring Justin Timberlake
"Outta Here" – Esmée Denters
"Show Me What I'm Looking For" – Carolina Liar
"Want" – Natalie Imbruglia
"Boys and Girls" – Pixie Lott
"3" – Britney Spears
"Sleza glamura" – Irina Saltykova

2010
"Whataya Want from Me" – Adam Lambert
"Missing" – Flyleaf
"Ride" – Ciara featuring Ludacris
"Kiss & Cry" – Iconiq
"Light Ahead" – Iconiq
"Tokyo Lady" – Iconiq
"Right Thru Me" – Nicki Minaj

2011
"No One Gonna Love You" – Jennifer Hudson
"Best Thing I Never Had" – Beyoncé
"You Can't Be Friends with Everyone" – Make Out
"25/8" – Mary J. Blige
"Mr. Wrong" – Mary J. Blige
"Until It's Gone" – Monica

2012
"Lazy Love" – Ne-Yo
"Brand New Me" – Alicia Keys

2013
"Lolita" – Leah LaBelle
"Just Give Me a Reason" – Pink featuring Nate Ruess
"Leggo" – B. Smyth featuring 2 Chainz
"Blurred Lines" – Robin Thicke featuring T.I. & Pharrell
"We Can't Stop" – Miley Cyrus
"Give It 2 U" – Robin Thicke featuring 2 Chainz & Kendrick Lamar
"Evil Eye" – Franz Ferdinand

2014
"Pills n Potions" – Nicki Minaj

2015
"Ba$$in" – Yelle
"Love Me" – The 1975
"BB Talk" – Miley Cyrus

2016
"After the Afterparty" – Charli XCX

2017
"Old School" – Urban Cone
"Malibu" – Miley Cyrus
"A L I E N S" – Coldplay
"Younger Now" – Miley Cyrus

2018
"Feel the Love Go" – Franz Ferdinand
"Give Yourself a Try" – The 1975
"Dose" – Ciara
"Close to Me" – Ellie Goulding, Diplo & Swae Lee

2020
"My Love" – Jack Gilinsky featuring Don Toliver

2021
"Obsessed" – Addison Rae
"Billy Goodbye" – Franz Ferdinand (co-directed with Alex Kapranos & Ben Cole)

2022
"Grace" – Marcus Mumford
"Ojala" – Maluma, the Rudeboyz and Adam Levine

References

External links
 Official Website

Diane Martel at Clipland
Diane Martel at mvdbase.com

American music video directors
Living people
Year of birth missing (living people)
Female music video directors